Blacklisting is the process of listing entities who are being denied a particular privilege or service.

Blacklist, black list, blacklisting or blacklisted may also refer to:

Exclusion list
 Blacklist (computing), blacklisting usages in computers
 Software blacklist, used by some digital rights management software
 Blacklist (employment), a list of people not to be employed
 Hollywood blacklist, one of the most infamous employment blacklists, from the McCarthy era
 NHS treatments blacklist, a list of medicines that are not allowed to be prescribed on an NHS prescription in the UK

Arts, entertainment, and media

Films and television
 The Blacklist, a 2013 American television series starring James Spader and Megan Boone
 The Blacklist: Redemption, a 2017 spinoff
 Blacklist (Thai TV series), a 2019 Thai television series
 Black List (1972 film), a Hong Kong film
 Black List (1995 film), a Canadian film directed by Jean-Marc Vallée
 The Black List (film series), a series of documentary films by Timothy Greenfield-Sanders and Elvis Mitchell
 The Blacklist (film), a 1916 American drama silent film
 The Black List (survey), an annual survey of development executives, ranking the "most-liked" motion picture screenplays not yet produced

Literature
 Black List, a 2012 novel by Brad Thor
 Blacklist (novel), a 2003 mystery novel by Sara Paretsky

Music

Groups and labels
 Blacklist (band), a rock band from Brooklyn
 Blacklisted (band), a hardcore punk band from Philadelphia
 The Blacklist (band), an Australian rock band

Albums
 Black List (Alex Chilton album), 1990
 Black List (L.A. Guns album), 2005
 Blacklist (EP), by Come and Rest, 2015
 Blacklisted (Neko Case album), 2002
 Blacklisted (Aaron Carter album), 2022

Songs
 "Blacklist", a song by Bring Me the Horizon from There Is a Hell Believe Me I've Seen It. There Is a Heaven Let's Keep It a Secret.
 "Blacklist", a song by The Legendary Pink Dots 
 "Blacklist", a song by Ronnie Radke featuring b.LaY

Video games
 Black List, a competing team in Crossfire
 Tom Clancy's Splinter Cell: Blacklist, a 2013 stealth action-adventure video game from Ubisoft

Other uses
 Operation Blacklist, a codename for the occupation of Japan by the Allied Powers at the end of World War II

See also
Black Book (gambling)